Hyperolius riggenbachi is a species of frog in the family Hyperoliidae. Its common name is Riggenbach's reed frog. It is found on Bamenda Highlands and the Adamawa Plateau, western and central Cameroon, and Mambilla and Obudu Plateaus of eastern Nigeria.
Its natural habitats are wetlands and small wooded watercourses in montane grassland. This species is very common within its small range, but is threatened by habitat loss caused by agricultural activities, wood collection, and human settlement.

References

riggenbachi
Frogs of Africa
Amphibians of Cameroon
Amphibians of West Africa
Amphibians described in 1910
Taxa named by Fritz Nieden
Taxonomy articles created by Polbot
Fauna of the Cameroonian Highlands forests